Tor Albert Ersdal (born 10 January 1972) is a Norwegian rower. He competed in the men's lightweight double sculls event at the 1996 Summer Olympics.

References

External links
 

1972 births
Living people
Norwegian male rowers
Olympic rowers of Norway
Rowers at the 1996 Summer Olympics
Sportspeople from Stavanger